The gens Quartia was an obscure plebeian family at ancient Rome.  No members of this gens appear in history, but several are known from inscriptions.

Origin
The nomen Quartius is a patronymic surname, derived from the cognomen Quartus, fourth.  There may at one time have been a praenomen Quartus, but it was not in general use in historical times, except in the feminine form, Quarta, which was regularly used as both a praenomen and cognomen.

Members
 Quintus Quartius, dedicated a tomb on Maiorica in Hispania Citerior to a woman named Scaraotia, aged twenty.
 Sextus Quartius, dedicated a tomb for Martia, a freedwoman buried at Carpentoracte in Gallia Narbonensis.
 Quartia Aphrodisia, mother of Quartia Herois.
 Titus Quartius Crescentinius, named in a funerary inscription from Lilybaeum in Sicily.
 Quartia Herois, daughter of Quartia Aphrodisia, wife of Marcus Publius Posidonius, and mother of Publius Flavianus, buried at Arelate in Gallia Narbonensis, aged twenty-two.
 Quartia Irvatilla, buried at Massilia in Gallia Narbonensis.
 Titus Quartius Masculus, named in a funerary inscription from Lilybaeum.
 Quartius Quietus, made a libationary offering to the gods at Colonia Claudia Ara Agrippinensium in Germania Inferior, in AD 252.
 Gaius Quartius Quintinus, dedicated a tomb for his friend, Gaius Apisius Zosimus, and his wife, Romogillia Festa, at Nemausus in Gallia Narbonensis.
 Quartius Reditus, made a libationary offering to Nehalennia at Ganventa in Gallia Belgica.
 Quartia Saturnina, dedicated a tomb at Mogontiacum to her husband, Marcus, a veteran of the twenty-second legion, and her son, Januarius.
 Quartia Secundilla, a freedwoman, and wife of Quartius Ulpius, named in a funerary inscription at Lugdunum in Gallia Lugdunensis.
 Gaius Quartius Secundus, a soldier in the thirteenth legion, named in a funerary inscription from Rome, dating to the second century AD.
 Quartius Ulpius, freedman of Primitivus, and husband of Quartia Secundilla, buried at Lugdunum.

See also
 List of Roman gentes

References

Bibliography
 Theodor Mommsen et alii, Corpus Inscriptionum Latinarum (The Body of Latin Inscriptions, abbreviated CIL), Berlin-Brandenburgische Akademie der Wissenschaften (1853–present).
 René Cagnat et alii, L'Année épigraphique (The Year in Epigraphy, abbreviated AE), Presses Universitaires de France (1888–present).
 Hans Petersen, "The Numeral Praenomina of the Romans", in Transactions of the American Philological Association, vol. xciii, pp. 347–354 (1962).
 Cristóbal Veny, Corpus de las Inscripciones Baleáricas hasta la Dominación Árabe (The Balearic Inscriptions up to the Arab Conquest, abbreviated CIBalear), Madrid (1965).

Roman gentes